The Institute of Automation, Chinese Academy of Sciences (CASIA) is a research lab belonging to the Chinese Academy of Sciences which researches robotics, pattern recognition and control theory.

See also
Meinü robot
List of datasets for machine-learning research

External links 
 

Automation
Automation organizations